The National Tea and High-Value Crops Research Institute (NTHRI), also known as National Tea Research Institute (NTRI), is a research institute located in Shinkiari, Mansehra, Pakistan. It is a government research organization that focuses on the research and development of high-value crops, particularly tea, as well as spices, medicinal and aromatic plants, and cash crops.

The institute conducts research on crop breeding, agronomy, post-harvest management, and value addition to help improve the quality and productivity of these crops. It also provides technical support and advice to farmers, entrepreneurs, and other stakeholders in the agriculture sector to promote the cultivation and commercialization of high-value crops.

History
National Tea and High-Value Crops Research Institute was founded in 1986 as National Tea Research Station.

In 1996, it was upgraded as an institute.

In 2013, it was upgraded and renamed as National Tea & High Value Crops Research Institute.

References

Mansehra District
Pakistan federal departments and agencies
Science and technology in Pakistan
Research Centres in Pakistan
1986 establishments in Pakistan